Soode is a small river in Hesse, Germany. It flows into the Lempe in Hombressen.

See also
List of rivers of Hesse

Rivers of Hesse
Reinhardswald
Rivers of Germany